is a junction passenger railway station in the city of Kamogawa, Chiba Prefecture Japan, operated by the East Japan Railway Company (JR East).

Lines
Awa-Kamogawa Station is served by the Sotobō Line and Uchibō Line, and forms the terminating point of both lines.

Station layout
The station consists of one island platform serving two tracks for the Sotobō Line, and one side platform serving the Uchibō Line. The station shares the distinction with Kamaishi Station and Kagoshima Station of being one of only three stations in Japan serving as the terminus of two lines, with only up traffic. The station building is on the east side. There is also a west exit near to Aeon and Kamogawa City Hall connected to east one with a bridge. The station has a Midori no Madoguchi staffed ticket office.

Platforms

History
Awa-Kamogawa Station opened on 11 July 1925, as a station on the Hōjō Line. The Hōjō Line was merged into the Bōsō Line in 1929, and the Bōsō Line itself was divided into the Bōsō-East and Bōsō-West Lines on 1 April 1933. These lines were renamed on 15 July 1972, to the Sotobō Line and Uchibō Line. The station was absorbed into the JR East network upon the privatization of the Japan National Railways (JNR) on 1 April 1987. A new station building was completed in August 2006.

Passenger statistics
In fiscal 2018, the station was used by an average of 1290 passengers daily (boarding passengers only).

Surrounding area
 Kamogawa city Hall

See also
 List of railway stations in Japan

References

External links

 JR East Station information 

Railway stations in Chiba Prefecture
Railway stations in Japan opened in 1925
Uchibō Line
Sotobō Line
Kamogawa, Chiba